Ravi Kant Garg is a leader of Bharatiya Janata Party Garg  and a former member of the Uttar Pradesh Legislative Assembly representing Mathura (Assembly constituency). He was Minister of State in the BJP government in 1991 under chief ministership of  Kalyan Singh. Yogi Adityanath government recently appointed him as head of an 11-member Uttar Pradesh Vyapari Kalyan Board.

References

People from Mathura
Bharatiya Janata Party politicians from Uttar Pradesh
Living people
Year of birth missing (living people)
Uttar Pradesh MLAs 1989–1991
Uttar Pradesh MLAs 1991–1993
Possibly living people